is a Japanese politician. He was named Minister of State, Chairman of the National Public Safety Commission on October 31, 2005.

Sources
http://www.senkyo.janjan.jp/bin/candidate/profile/profile.php?id=60171

|-

|-

1929 births
Living people
Government ministers of Japan
People from Kanazawa, Ishikawa
21st-century Japanese politicians